Eucalyptus parramattensis, commonly known as the Parramatta red gum or drooping red gum, is a species of small to medium-sized tree that is endemic to eastern New South Wales. It has smooth, mottled bark, lance-shaped to curved adult leaves, flower buds in groups of seven, white flowers and hemispherical fruit.

Description
It has smooth, mottled grey, brown and yellow bark. Flowering occurs from November to December and the flowers are white.

Taxonomy
Eucalyptus parramattensis was first formally described in 1913 by Edwin Cuthbert Hall in Proceedings of the Linnean Society of New South Wales from material collected by Richard Thomas Baker.

Two subspecies and one variety are accepted by the Australian Plant Census:
 Eucalyptus parramattensis subsp.  L.A.S.Johnson & Blaxell is usually a poorly-formed tree with larger leaves, buds and fruit than subspecies parramattensis;
 Eucalyptus parramattensis E.C.Hall subsp. parramattensis has a conical operculum;
 Eucalyptus parramattensis var.  Blakely has a rounded operculum.

Distribution and habitat
Parramatta red gum grows in woodland, on flat and gently sloping country, often in wet sites on sandy soils. Subspecies parramattensis is found to the north-west of Sydney, subspecies  in the lower Hunter River and var.  occurs from near Parramatta to the foothills of the Blue Mountains.

References

parramattensis
Myrtales of Australia
Flora of New South Wales
Trees of Australia
Plants described in 1913